The Zhang Garden or Zhangyuan(張園) is a European-style former garrison building in Tianijn, China built in the 1930s. Prior to construction of the garrison building the site contained a mansion residence, built in 1916 in the Japanese Concession of Tianjin by Zhang Biao, a former high-ranking official in the Qing Court. The mansion served as a temporary home for both  Sun Yat-sen, the first president of the Republic of China, who briefly resided there in 1924, as well as Puyi, the last Emperor of the Qing Dynasty, who lived in the now demolished mansion from 1925 until 1929.

History 
In 1912, Qing official Zhang Biao, settled in the Japanese Concession in Tianijn and built a three-story mansion in a Western classical-style on Miyajima Street (now No.59 Anshan Road). By the 1920s he cooperated with a businessman to create a  restaurant, theater, and an open-air cinema at Zhangyuan. Four bungalows on the right side of the park for Puyi's entourage were also later built. After Puyi left Tianjin, Zhang Biao's son sold the Zhang Garden to the Japanese military in the 1930s and it was subsequently demolished and rebuilt. It was then used as a garrison station for the Japanese Concession police. After World War 2 it was used as a garrison for the Chinese Kuomintang Army in 1946 during the Chinese Civil War. It has since been used as a theatre and a library.

Gallery

See also 

 Foreign concessions in Tianjin
 Wanrong
 Wenxiu

References 

Buildings and structures completed in 1916
Qing dynasty architecture
Buildings and structures in Tianjin